Sirumarudur  is a village in the  
Avadaiyarkoilrevenue block of Pudukkottai district, Tamil Nadu, India.

Demographics 

As per the 2001 census, Sirumarudur had a total population of 451 with 213 males and 238 females. Out of the total population 295 people were literate.

References

Villages in Pudukkottai district